Olga Diaz is a U.S. politician. , Diaz is a member of the Escondido City Council.

Education
Diaz graduated from Santa Clara University where she successfully got a Bachelor of Science and Commerce degree in public accounting. Following her graduation, she was wanted by a global accounting firm called PriceWaterhouseCoopers. She continued to serve her alma mater by doing Institutional Research for it.

Personal Information 

Diaz is a founding member of the Route 78 Rotary Club and a former member of the Escondido Sunrise Rotary Club. She owns two coffee shops in Escondido. She no longer owns The Blue Mug.

Diaz is married to Neil Griffin, a former marine police lieutenant who is currently a crime novelist.  They have four children.

Although she has been a California resident her whole life, she is notable as the first Latina and a liberal Democrat elected to the generally conservative council.

Political background
Diaz had unsuccessfully run in the 2006 city council election. She won in November 2008 with support not only from urban areas with a liberal voting pattern, but also from affluent areas that normally vote for conservatives.

Diaz's election to the council changed the majority position of the council on immigration issues. The Escondido City Council had become known as the "city without pity" for illegal immigrants. But as a result of Diaz' election, discussions about implementing controversial immigration laws ended.

In 2014 Diaz unsuccessfully ran against GOP incumbent mayor, Sam Abed, in Escondido's mayoral election.

In 2020, Diaz ran for the San Diego County Board of Supervisors.  In the March 3 primary, she finished in third place with 26% of the vote, trailing incumbent Supervisor Kristen Gaspar and former Obama administration official Terra Lawson-Remer, who won the November general election.

References

External links
 Olga Diaz at OlgaDiaz.com (official councilmember website)

People from Escondido, California
Living people
California city council members
Year of birth missing (living people)
Place of birth missing (living people)
Women city councillors in California
21st-century American women